Laken may refer to:

 Dutch spelling of Laeken, a suburb of Brussels
 Laken Pass, a mountain pass in Tibet
 Thomas Laken (born 1972), Vanuatuan politician
 William Laken (died 1475), English serjeant-at-law and judge
 Laken Lockridge, a character on the American soap opera Santa Barbara